98 Degrees and Rising is the second album released by American boy band 98 Degrees. It was recorded at Blue Wave Studios in Vancouver, British Columbia, Canada and released by Motown on October 20, 1998. The album features the singles "Because of You" and "The Hardest Thing", which peaked at No. 3 and No. 5 on the Billboard Hot 100 respectively. The album also features two covers,  Mark Wills' "I Do (Cherish You)" and "She's Out of My Life", made famous by Michael Jackson. It also features a duet with label mate Stevie Wonder, "True to Your Heart", which was featured on the soundtrack of the 1998 Disney film Mulan, as well as the song "Fly with Me", which was featured on the soundtrack album for the 1999 film Pokémon: The First Movie (although it does not appear in the film itself). The album has sold over four million copies in the United States alone, becoming the band's best-selling album. This was also the band's last album on Motown (not counting the Japanese release of This Christmas) before they left for Motown's parent company, Universal Records.

Track listing

Asian and Dutch Edition

Charts

Weekly charts

Year-end charts

Certifications

References

1998 albums
98 Degrees albums
Motown albums